The 2006 NCAA Division I Outdoor Track and Field Championships were contested at the 85th annual NCAA-sanctioned track meet to determine the individual and team champions of men's and women's Division I collegiate outdoor track and field in the United States.

This year's meet, the 25th with both men's and women's championships, was held June 7–10, 2006 at Hornet Stadium at Sacramento State University in Sacramento, California. 

Florida State won the men's title, the Seminoles' first.

Auburn won the women's title, the Tigers' first.

Team results 
 Note: Top 10 only
 (DC) = Defending champions
Full results

Men's standings

Women's standings

References

NCAA Men's Outdoor Track and Field Championship
NCAA Division I Outdoor Track And Field Championships
NCAA Division I Outdoor Track And Field Championships
NCAA Division I Outdoor Track and Field Championships
NCAA Women's Outdoor Track and Field Championship